Soloella guttivaga is a species of moth in the  family Erebidae. The species is found in Africa, including Nigeria and Congo.

References

External links 
 Species info

Aganainae
Moths of Africa
Moths described in 1854